Acusilas is a genus of orb-weaver spiders first described by Eugène Simon in 1895.

Species
 it contains nine species:
Acusilas africanus Simon, 1895 – West, Central, East Africa
Acusilas callidus Schmidt & Scharff, 2008 – Indonesia (Sulawesi)
Acusilas coccineus Simon, 1895 – India, China to Indonesia (Moluccas)
Acusilas dahoneus Barrion & Litsinger, 1995 – Philippines
Acusilas lepidus (Thorell, 1898) – Myanmar
Acusilas malaccensis Murphy & Murphy, 1983 – Thailand, Laos, China, Malaysia, Sumatra, Borneo
Acusilas spiralis Schmidt & Scharff, 2008 – Indonesia (Sumatra)
Acusilas vei Schmidt & Scharff, 2008 – Indonesia (Sulawesi)
Acusilas vilei Schmidt & Scharff, 2008 – Indonesia (Sulawesi)

References

External links

Araneidae
Araneomorphae genera
Spiders of Africa
Spiders of Asia
Taxa named by Eugène Simon